Wesley's Chapel Arbor and Cemetery is a historic arbor and cemetery and national historic district located near Blackburn, Catawba County, North Carolina. The district encompasses 1 contributing building and 1 contributing site. Wesley's Chapel Arbor was built about 1890, and is a large open Rustic Methodist camp meeting structure, nearly square, with a broad hipped roof.  Wesley's Chapel Cemetery was established about 1850.

It was added to the National Register of Historic Places in 1990.

References

Properties of religious function on the National Register of Historic Places in North Carolina
Historic districts on the National Register of Historic Places in North Carolina
1850 establishments in North Carolina
Rustic architecture in North Carolina
Methodist churches in North Carolina
Buildings and structures completed in 1890
Buildings and structures in Catawba County, North Carolina
National Register of Historic Places in Catawba County, North Carolina
Methodism in North Carolina
Camp meeting grounds